Helltrain is a Swedish death 'n' roll band formed in Luleå in 2002 by vocalist and bassist Pierre Törnkvist. The current line-up consists of Pierre Törnkvist (vocals), Patrik Törnkvist (guitars, keyboards), Mikael Sandorf (guitars), Markus Parkkila (bass) and Fredrik Andersson (drums). Mikael and Mats joined Helltrain after their original band The Duskfall disbanded in 2008. Helltrain has released one EP (The 666 EP) and three studio albums (Route 666, Rock n' Roll Devil and Death Is Coming) to date. Two singles ("Wolfnight" and "On Your Knees") were released in 2018.

History 
In 2002, Helltrain recorded three songs, "Route 666", "Rot n' roll" and Helltrain", for a demo. They sent this demo to the record label Nuclear Blast. The demo was later released as "The 666 EP" (limited edition 500 copies) by Swedish underground label Heathendoom Music.

Late 2006 saw the US release of the Route 666 album by the Jimmy Franks Recording Company/Universal Records. In 2007, the band quit Nuclear Blast and signed to Jimmy Franks Recording Company.

Helltrain's second album, Rock n' Roll Devil, was released 9 September 2008.

Helltrain´s third album, Death Is Coming, was released in May 2012. Available as free digital download on the Helltrain homepage, a CD version, and a limited vinyl LP version.

Drummer Oskar Karlsson died in March 2016.

Members 
 Pierre Törnkvist – bass (2002–2009) guitar (2002–2003) vocals (2002–present)
 Patrik Törnkvist – bass (2002–2003) guitar, organ, piano (2002–present)
 Mikael Sandorf – guitars (2009–present)
 Fredrik Andersson – drums (2018–present)
 Markus Parkkila – bass (2018–present)

Former members 
 Oskar Karlsson – drums (2002–2016) bass (2002–2003)
 Mats Järnil – bass (2009–2018)

Discography 
 The 666 EP (2003)
 Route 666 (2006)
 Rock n' Roll Devil (2008)
 Death Is Сoming (2012)
 "Wolfnight" (2018 – single)
 "On Your Knees" (2018 – single)

References

External links 
 Helltrain's official website

Swedish musical groups
Musical groups established in 2002
Nuclear Blast artists
2002 establishments in Sweden